Pisa International Airport , also named Galileo Galilei Airport is an airport located in Pisa, Italy. It is the main airport in Tuscany and the 10th in Italy in terms of passengers. It is named after Galileo Galilei, the famous scientist and native of Pisa. The airport was first developed for the military in the 1930s and 1940s.
The airport was used by 5,233,118 passengers in 2017. It serves as a focus city of Ryanair.

Overview
Since 2017 the airport has its own Pisa Mover shuttle service to and from Pisa Central railway station. A return ticket is ten euros and the shuttle takes just 5 minutes. The airport also has 5 passenger and 1 coach parking areas.

Besides civilian operations, the airport is also used extensively by the Aeronautica Militare (Italian Air Force) and is a base for, amongst others, the C-130 Hercules and C-27J Spartan transport aircraft. The airport is home to 46ª Brigata Aerea Silvio Angelucci (46th Air Brigade). During the end of World War II the airport was used as a base for the 15th Air Force of the United States Army Air Forces.

Facilities

The terminal building has 16 gates (numbered 01-11 and 21-25), one of which (gate 23) is equipped with a jetway

Airlines and destinations

Statistics
In 2006 and 2007, the airport was the fastest growing among Italy's top 15 airports with passenger numbers up 30% in 2006 and 24% in 2007. In 2008 it was Italy's 11th busiest airport handling  and 4,011,525 passengers in 2010. In 2011 the growth rise to 11.3% and the airport carried 4.526.723 passengers.

Accidents and incidents
On 27 January 1952, Seaboard & Western Airlines Douglas C-54A-5-DO overshot the runway on landing. Fire consumed the aircraft. 47 out of the 50 cows carried on board the plane died.
On 23 November 2009, Italian Air Force Lockheed KC-130J Hercules MM62176 of the based 46 Aerobrigata crashed just after take-off. All five crew members were killed.

See also
Pisa Aeroporto railway station
Florence Airport, Peretola, the second Tuscan international airport
Marina di Campo Airport, another Tuscan airport

References

External links

 Official website
 Toscana Aeroporti website
 News about the airport
 
 

Airports in Italy
Transport in Tuscany
Airport
Buildings and structures in Pisa
Geography of Pisa
Airfields of the United States Army Air Forces in Italy
Airports established in 1911
1911 establishments in Italy